This is a list of now defunct airlines from Rwanda.

See also

 List of airlines of Rwanda
 List of airports in Rwanda

References

Rwanda
Airlines
Airlines, defunct